The Cedar Rapids Community School District (CRCSD) is a public school district located in Cedar Rapids, Iowa. It has the second largest enrollment in the state of Iowa. The district has 21 elementary schools, 6 middle schools, 3 high schools, and 1 alternative high school.

The district is in Linn County. In addition to most of Cedar Rapids it serves Hiawatha, most of Robins, and Palo.

Schools
The district has 31 total schools, most of which are named after United States presidents.

Elementary schools
CRCSD has 21 elementary schools, including one year-round school (Taylor). Elementary schools run from 8:50 AM to 3:50 PM, and dismiss at 2:20 PM each Friday.  On March 21, 2012, it was announced that one of the two year-round schools, Polk Elementary school would close.

Middle schools
Middle schools run from 7:50 AM to 2:50 PM, and dismiss at 1:20 on early-dismissal days.

High schools
Jefferson runs from 7:50 AM to 3 PM; and Kennedy runs from 7:50 AM to 3 PM. This was changed for the 2016 to 2017 school year and onward to accommodate a seventh period class. Washington runs from 7:50 AM to 3 PM. All three high schools dismiss at 1:30pm every Friday due to professional development time for teachers.

Enrollment

See also
List of school districts in Iowa

References

External links
 Cedar Rapids Community School District

Education in Cedar Rapids, Iowa
School districts in Iowa
Education in Linn County, Iowa